Noel McCamish (7 May 1900 – 26 April 1945) was a former Australian rules footballer who played with Collingwood in the Victorian Football League (VFL).

Notes

External links 
		
Noel McCamish's profile at Collingwood Forever

1900 births
1945 deaths
Australian rules footballers from Western Australia
Collingwood Football Club players
Perth Football Club players